is a Japanese original net animation anime series produced by Sunrise Beyond. A sequel to the 2018 anime Gundam Build Divers, it is the first Gundam anime series to be released in the Reiwa period, released to celebrate the franchise's 40th anniversary. The series is directed by Shinya Watada and written by Yasuyuki Muto. Initially announced at the Gundam 40th anniversary video, the series aired on its Gundam Channel YouTube channel in Japan from October 10 to December 26, 2019. A TV airing of the ONA began on Tokyo MX and later in BS11 on October 12, 2019, as part of the Anime+ lineup. A second season premiered on April 9, 2020, and ended on August 27, 2020. Two spinoffs of the series were later serialized in Kadokawa's Gundam Ace magazine and Hobby Japan.

Plot
Two years has passed since the EL-Diver Incident, an event that almost destroyed the Gunpla Battle Nexus Online (GBN) game until it was resolved by the force group known as "Build Divers", and soon after more EL-Divers were discovered. In order to make the game secure, a newer version of the game was rolled out in order to prevent the same incident from happening again and with newer experiences that would make the gameplay more immersive to players. The story focuses on Hiroto Kuga, a high schooler who is a rogue mercenary diver, who goes in the game and wanders throughout its countless dimensions and helping out forces and divers whether its insistence or hire. Although he chooses to be without being affiliated with anyone and refuses rewards and force invites and isolates himself from other people even IRL.  Despite his wandering solo diver status, he's always searching and yearning to be reunited with a mysterious girl from his past named Eve, who was in fact the very first EL-Diver to appear in the game. But after a special request mission, Hiroto is united with three other active divers in a strange world named "Eldora" and forms the Force group "BUILD DiVERS" in what appears to be just another GBN gamespace event, until they learn the truth about Eldora and its consequences not only for GBN, but for the entire world.

Characters

BUILD DiVERS
 / 

The main protagonist of the series and a high-school builder, veteran diver, and a former ace member of the Force group Avalon, who lives in Yokohama. He was one of the first minors to make it to the deep end of GBN, due to his conviction of being a person who does his best to help others.  He was active prior and during the events of the previous series.  Now working as a rogue diver for hire after leaving Avalon, he wanders the GBN gamespace alone, harboring regrets after the death of his close friend and lover, the EL-Diver Eve. He is very calm and a man of few words, usually refusing others' reward and help, especially on joining other forces. But when a special mission done by Freddie united him with Kazami, May and Parviz, they accidentally formed the force team named "BUILD DiVERS" to protect the Eldorans from the One-Eyes army. Currently he is the ace of his unit and the leader of the overall force.
Hiroto uses the PFF-X7 Core Gundam as his main Gunpla, based on the RX-78-2 Gundam from the original Mobile Suit Gundam series. Its special armament system called the "core-change" gimmick and his first theme invented from that gimmick is the "Planets System". This allows the Core Gundam to be equipped with various types of armor and weapons, each for a different situation named after the eight planets. Hiroto later upgrades his Gunpla into the PFF-X7II Core Gundam II. This new Core Gundam can transform into the "Core Flyer", in a similar fashion to the original Gundam's FF-X7 Core Fighter for increased mobility and like its predecessor, it can also use the Planets System:
Earth Armor (PFF-X7/E3 Earthree Gundam): Core Gundam's default blue armor, focused on traditional all-around combat.
Mars Armor (PFF-X7/M4 Marsfour Gundam): A red armor whose focus is on fragments of four styles of close combat, hence "Cross-Combat". 
Venus Armor (PFF-X7/V2 Veetwo Gundam): A green armor whose focus is commando style ranged and bombardment combat, additionally with option works.
Mercury Armor (PFF-X7/M1 Mercuone Gundam): A navy armor whose focus is underwater combat.
Jupiter Armor (PFF-X7/J5 Jupitive Gundam): A white armor whose focus is fast orbital combat.
Uranus Armor (PFF-X7II/U7 Uraven Gundam): An indigo armor focused on reconnaissance and high powered sniping.
Saturn Armor (PFF-X7II/S6 Saturnix Gundam): An orange armor focused in demolition style close combat without beam weapons, originally developed to counter Gundam Frames.
Neptune Armor (PFF-X7II/N8 Nepteight Gundam): An aqua-green armor equipped with a customized Volture Lumiere system similar to the one from Mobile Suit Gundam SEED C.E. 73: Stargazer, intended to be used for traveling through GBN's space in a short amount of time, but was used for launching into orbit instead of maneuvering in deep space. It is ultimately discarded in Eldora's orbit due to the strain of leaving Eldora's gravitational field.  
PFF-X7II/BUILD DiVERS Re:Rising Gundam: A special combination of the Core Gundam II with the WoDom Pod + and parts from the Gundam Aegis Knight and the EX Valkylander, armed with two giant beam sabers, eight miracle wings born from Eve's blessings, and the "Grand Cross Cannon", Hiroto's first special move, made with the help of his team.
In one occasion, Hiroto changes his avatar to a Haro to pilot the Mobile Builder Haro Loader to help with the repairs on Cuadorn by making a prosthetic wing out of gunpla parts. During the Gunpla Battle Royal, he pilots an unmodified ASW-G-08 Gundam Barbatos Lupus Rex from Mobile Suit Gundam: Iron-Blooded Orphans.  
In Battlelogue, it is revealed that he has made a second Core Gundam II that he leaves on Eldora with the colors of the Gundam MK-II Titan. Another variant of this Gunpla sports the old "Gundam G3" colors with his team's personal crest, which is most likely to represent Sarah since the color of her hair, eyes, and dress embody Hiroto's time with Eve before they joined Avalon and to symbolize how he has officially befriended the original Build Divers. Each of the two units have unique advancements, the Titan color specializes in ground and underwater combat and the G3 color specializes in aerial and space combat.

A seemingly late teens female diver who prefers to play solo, she is a very calm and no-nonsense girl whose interest is in battles alone. However, she is not a fan of those who engage their opponents head on and prefers to implement a strategic approach. She is mature and has a strong sense of justice, and can be impulsive rushing into situations, especially for those in danger. Later in the series, she is revealed to be one of the 87 EL-Divers, however she was not one of those who were saved after the EL-Diver incident two years ago, she was born shortly after. After she was born she was given her own Mobile Doll body similar to Sarah, that is when she first met her, Koichi, Tsukasa, and Nanami. During the Lotus Challenge Eldoran style rehearsal battle it is revealed that she, as a new sister of Sarah, addresses the latter as the older since Sarah is chronologically older, regardless of her maturity. In the final episode, she is revealed to have been born with the remnant data originating from Eve, the first born EL-Diver who Hiroto befriended and fell in love with several years ago, and carries Eve's earring on her armband. In Battlelogue, it's implied that she is currently living with Hiroto IRL and in GBN is his attendant.
May uses the JMA0530-MAY WoDom Pod as her main Gunpla, which is a customized JMA-0530 Walking Dome from Turn A Gundam. In the later episodes, the mobile suit is revealed to be a disguise for its true form, the HER-SELF Mobile Doll May. May later upgrades her WoDom Pod into the JMA0530-MAYBD WoDom Pod +. During the Gunpla Battle Royal, she uses her Mobile Doll (albeit with a new color scheme and the Gundam Base logo) along with an unmodified NZ-999 II Neo Zeong mobile armor from Mobile Suit Gundam Narrative.

 / 

A diver who was a former member of the diver group "Mu Dish". He is a very energetic diver who fancies himself as a hero and seeks to make a name for himself in GBN. Though he enjoys the game, he also has been a long fan of the G-TUBER Captain Zeon on his success in several battles, but this obsession drove his former teammates to losing and soon left the group. It was at that time he met Hiroto and the others to form the new BUILD DiVERS group to prove his sense of justice, and be the leader of their team, although he doesn't mind Hiroto being the team's ace and hero. In real life, Kazami is a teenager with a scrawny body and the son of a fisherman. Currently he is the leader of the latter unit, the left hand sub-leader of the overall force and the poster guy for their G-tube channel.
Kazami uses ZGMF-X19AK Gundam Justice Knight as his main Gunpla, which is a ZGMF-X19A Infinite Justice from Mobile Suit Gundam SEED Destiny customized with knight motif and limited armament. He also possesses a modified Petit'gguy called the Justi'gguy. Kazami later uses the GAT-X303K Gundam Aegis Knight as his main Gunpla, inspired from the GAT-X303 Aegis Gundam from Mobile Suit Gundam SEED, which is also customized with knight motif and limited armament, especially its larger shield that can combine with its other weapons to form the bigger "Keraunos Hyper Beam Sword", when it assumes "King Mode" and a transformable Assault Mode similar to the original Aegis. During the Gunpla Battle Royal, he pilots an unmodified ZGMF-X42S Destiny Gundam also from SEED Destiny.

 / 

A novice diver and builder whose avatar has fox-like features, inspired from being the younger brother of Shahryar, one of the characters of the previous series. He usually takes on playing the game after taking advice from his older brother, but due to his shy and often timid personality, thus had problems making friends. In real life, Patrick is a teenage foreigner from a wealthy Middle Eastern family, just like his brother. He was left paralyzed after his glider crashed in the middle of a storm; said incident caused him to have a fear of heights, even though he doesn't want to be and eventually breaks through it.
Parviz uses the Valkylander, which he nicknamed "Morgiana", as his main Gunpla, a customized Super Deformed GNY-001F Gundam Astraea Type-F with elements from the Gundlander series in which first appears as a dragon and can transform into its SD Mobile Suit form when in battle. On some occasions, it carries the "Avalanche Rex Buster", a cannon which can also combine with the Gunpla itself. It also has its own version of the Trans-Am system from the 00 series called "Gundrans-Am". Parviz later makes another version his Gunpla called the EX Valkylander, based on the GNY-001 Gundam Astraea and its design elements based on the Sacred Beast Cuadorn, including bigger wings for itself and the Re:Rising Gundam where they grow into miracle wings. In one occasion, Parviz changes his avatar to a Haro to pilot the Mobile Builder Haro Fitter to help with the repairs on Cuadorn. During the Gunpla Battle Royal, he pilots an unmodified version of the XXXG-00W0 Wing Gundam Zero from Gundam Wing: Endless Waltz.

Hiroto's classmate who practices archery and childhood friend who lives next door and works at the same Gundam Base where he logs into GBN. She cares deeply about him, even knowing his heart belongs to another. She witnessed him coming home in the rain and crying on the day that Eve was sacrificed and becomes more worried upon learning that he is risking his life in a real war. In the final episode, she joins GBN as a new member of Hiroto's team and meets Freddie along with the New Eldorans. Her diver avatar is a shrine priestess in a dress miko.
The only known gunpla she has is a pink Petit'gguy that she built with Hiroto's supervision from back when they were in elementary school.

People of Eldora

A preteen anthropomorphic dog boy who lived on Planet Eldora, considered to be one of the "New People" after the departure of the Ancients eons ago. He is very cheerful and shows a lot of respect to the BUILD DiVERS, often calling them Creators. He is also the one who can summon them through the temples left behind by the Ancients. He saw many of the Build Divers' accomplishments on the GBN live stream via the ruins and would go to the ruins everyday just to watch them. He originally planned to use the ruins to summon the original Build Divers, but ended up making a new team of Build Divers instead, and initially thought they were part of them, with two of the members, Hiroto and May, having a connection to Sarah and one, Parviz, having an indirect connection to her. Like Sarah, he usually rides in a Gunpla as a passenger, mostly with Hiroto. He initially served as the BUILD DiVERS' motivator, but is now the Eldoran representative member of the team and later on the entire Build Diver force. It is revealed that his ancient ancestral genes came from a dog that belonged to one of Alus's creators who's face Eve merited.
After Alus's defeat Hiroto eventually leaves a copy of the Saturn armor on Eldora for the latter to test-fly on.

A late teen anthropomorphic cat girl who lives on Eldora. She is the older sister of Freddie, who is very wary about the BUILD DiVERS's appearance in their village. She usually has a strong sense of justice but doesn't get along with Kazami at times, regardless the latter having a crush on her.

Maiya and Freddie's childhood friend. Stola wants to join the Eldora Resistance against the One-Eyes. After Alus fired the satellite cannon on the city of Seguri, he became one of the sole survivors of the event.

,  and 

Three Eldoran children in the mountain village, who are close friends with Freddie and Stola.  They become very close with Parviz.

Freddie, Maya, and Jed's father and the village chief of their mountain village on Eldora.

Hulun's Grandfather. An old Badger person who lives on crop farming in Freddie's village, raising his crops with care. Despite his grumpy personality and looks, he is a very influential person, among the people of the mountain.

Freddie and Maiya's elder brother, and leader of a platoon in the Eldora Resistance. Freddie idolizes him and aspires to be like him when he is an adult and his favorite person in his life. He dies alongside the residents of Seguri when Alus fires his orbital cannon to obliterate the city.

The leader of the Eldora Resistance's ground forces, and later on the temporary leader of the New People as they rebuild from the damage caused by the satellite cannon.

 and 

Two members of the Eldora Resistance, who survived the Satellite Cannon firing on Seguri alongside Stola. During the final episode, they come across a surviving Guard Eye unit and take it under their care.

A cat-like person, who is part of the Eldora Resistance. He has once known Masaki Shido when he first appeared in Eldora before Alus brainwashed him and turned him against his group. With him the surviving member of his division, he had developed a dislike towards the BUILD DiVERS, but slowly trusts them sooner and later. After Jed's death, he leads a new platoon for the Resistance to assist the BUILD DiVERS.

A giant biomechanical dragon that existed in the Legends of Eldora for centuries. Once created by the Ancients, he helped them with protecting Eldora from outside threats eons ago until they decided to depart from space to search for new planets to colonize. He soon fell into a deep sleep, watching over the "New People" that flourished the planet after the Ancients' departure. After Masaki stumbled into Eldora, he assisted him with fighting against the One-Eyes until it was injured. Since then, it took refuge in Milagg Mountain until it was awakened once more by Freddie and Parviz to help Hiroto and May repel back Alus's attack against them. Reluctant to accept the BUILD DiVERS' help at first, Cuadorn agrees to ally with them after realizing their will to protect their friends in Eldora. Cuadorn's wing is later restored with some spare Gunpla parts provided by Parviz, with the beast later joining the BUILD DiVERS on their mission to rescue Masaki. He and Masaki later assist the BUILD DiVERS in destroying Alus' satellite cannon and, upon its destruction, destroy its mainframe to prevent Alus from retreating back to Eldora. After the final battle, Cuadorn is seen with some New Eldorans on Milagg Mountain which was relocated in the crater where Seguri City once stood.
His new wing was built primarily using loose gunpla parts from the XXXG-00W0 Wing Gundam Zero from Gundam Wing: Endless Waltz and RX-104 Penelope from Mobile Suit Gundam: Hathaway's Flash.

One-Eyes
 /  / 

A veteran S-Ranked Diver who May has been searching for since his disappearance. In real life, Masaki is bed-ridden at the city's general hospital after falling into a coma while logged in to GBN half a year prior to the events of the series. Later, it is revealed that he is brainwashed by the One-Eyes, becoming a masked man who served Alus and sided with them to terrorize Eldora. May recognized him as such despite his appearance in Eldora. However, his extended time in Eldora plus the brainwashing from the One-Eyes caused a serious deterioration on his real life self and his health condition. But due to the BUILD DiVERS' efforts, Masaki is freed from Alus' control and returns to his body back in the real world. With his sister's consent, Masaki returns to Eldora and teams up with Cuadorn again to assist the BUILD DiVERS in the final battle against Alus. He and Cuadorn later destroy the satellite cannon's mainframe to prevent Alus from returning to Eldora.
Masaki uses the MSF-007TE Gundam Tertium as his main Gunpla, a heavily customized MSF-007 Gundam Mark-III from Z-MSV. After being brainwashed by Alus, his Gunpla is converted into the MSF-007SS Gundam Seltsam equipped with the massive Seltsam Arm, which gives the Gunpla a demonic look while displaying massive strength. After Masaki is finally released from Alus's control, his Gunpla is converted into the Gundam Advanced Tertium, now equipped with the Tertium Arms for space combat.

The series's main antagonist, an Artificial Intelligence entity residing in Eldora's moon which was created by the Ancients to protect the planet from outside threats. After the Ancients left the ravaged planet after a long war, Alus entered into a long slumber. Once he reawakened, he mistook the current inhabitants of Eldora for invaders and started attacking them, using his vast knowledge and resources. After having his orbital cannon and mobile units destroyed by the BUILD DiVERS, he angrily decided to invade GBN as a last resort to destroy them, the game and all Divers in it. In the end, he and his entire fleet, alongside his mobile suits, were defeated and sank down by the BUILD DiVERS, the Third Coalition of Volunteers and many other Divers in GBN, with Alus being deleted by both Hiroto and Riku, during which, he passes on after seeing a vision of two Ancient Eldorans resembling Eve and Sarah. After the final battle, his feelings and some of his data are reincarnated as an infant EL-Diver carrying a pendant resembling a Guard Eye, making him the 88th EL-Diver.
Due to Alus's vast access to GBN through Masaki, he was able to create and build mechanical puppets based on Gunpla seen in GBN Online. In the second season, Alus develops the AGP-X1 Alus Core Gundam, a more powerful replica of Hiroto Kuga's Core Gundam with more upgraded specifications and weaponry to fight the BUILD DiVERS. It utilizes a similar core-change gimmick like the original Core Gundam, allowing it to be equipped with several armors made by Alus himself.
AGP-X1/E3 Alus Earthree Gundam: An armor based on the Core Gundam's Earth Armor with the Uraven Gundam's Rifle. A variant of this is created when Alus steals the original Earth Armor from Hiroto during the final battle against him.  
AGP-X1/NU Fake ν Gundam: An armor based on the RX-93 ν Gundam from Mobile Suit Gundam: Char's Counterattack. 
Dubious Arche Gundam: An armor based on the GNW-20000 Arche Gundam from Mobile Suit Gundam 00. 
Reverse Turn X: An armor based on the CONCEPT-X 6-1-2 Turn X from Turn A Gundam.
The Nu, Arche and Turn X units were first defeated by the BUILD DiVERS in their second attempt to destroy Alus's orbital cannon. Said units, along with Alus's Earthree and Core Gundams, were all permanently destroyed by the same team assisted by a few other Divers in GBN during Alus's attempted invasion on the game.

The Guard Eyes are unmanned machines that pilot the larger, One-Eyes mecha. Guard Eyes are usually sent alone as scouts prior to their attacks on Eldoran settlements. In the final episode, one of them remains under the care of Calico and Zabun after Alus's downfall. In Battlelogue, said unit is revealed to be friendly with the people of Freddie's village who accepted it and is able to express emotions through the trembling of its iris and body language.

Third Coalition of Volunteers

A flamboyant veteran diver, affectionately referred to as "sis" or "mama" and leader of the Force group "Adam's Apple". He serves as both a bartender (both in-game and in real life) and May's caretaker, until he gives her to Hiroto, at her own choice. 
Similar to the previous series, he uses the ZGMF-X20A-LP Gundam Love Phantom. During the Gunpla Battle Royal, he pilots an unmodified ASW-G-01 Gundam Bael from Mobile Suit Gundam: Iron-Blooded Orphans.

 / 

Parviz's older brother, he is leader of the Force group  and a veteran Diver, who is among the top two Gunpla builders in GBN. He was the one who convinced Parviz to join GBN after his little brother's accident. 
His main Gunpla is the GN-1001N Seravee Gundam Scheherazade.

 / 

A staff member of The Gundam Base Tokyo and younger sister of Koichi Nanase, one of the members of the original Build Divers. She appears in the series as May's bodyguard during offline meetings. 
During the final battle, she also uses her Diver avatar but is now equipped with a battle armor resembling the MA-04X Zakrello from Mobile Suit Gundam.

 / 

A high schooler and a female diver dressed as a kunoichi, she is a member of the original Build Divers. She is very respectful to Par's good naming sense for SD Gunpla and for his Gunpla's special features.            
During the BUILD DiVERS' training match and the battle against Alus' fleet, she pilots the RX-零 RX-Zeromaru as her main Gunpla. During the Gunpla Battle Royal, she pilots an unmodified GNT-0000 00 Qan[T] from Mobile Suit Gundam 00 the Movie: A Wakening of the Trailblazer. It is also revealed that out of non-SD Gundam characters Heero Yuy is her favorite.

 / 

A member of the original Build Divers who also goes in the nickname , Koichi is a veteran Gunpla builder who builds rental units for The Gundam Base Tokyo and now works in the establishment prior to the first series. He is also responsible for the creation of the Build Decal System alongside the Mobile Doll with Tsukasa's help to allow EL-Divers to manifest into the real world. Due to a flashback it is implied that he was Sarah's caretaker when more EL-Divers got discovered and for the last 2 years.  
During the final battle against Alus, both him and Tsukasa piloted the MHF-01DR Lord Astray Double Rebake, a customized Lord Astray Z from Mobile Suit Gundam SEED ASTRAY Princess of the Sky which allowed both divers to pilot one mobile suit and is armed with two forms, each tailored to both divers' fighting styles. Koichi controls the Gunpla's Cuardo Mode. His other Gunpla is the RMS-117G11 Galbaldy Rebake which he pilots alone during the BUILD DiVERS' training match.

A former GP-Duelist and a vertan builder who once had a grudge on GBN and was involved in the Break Decal Incident 2 years ago until he changed his ways. Alongside Koichi, they created the Build Decal System and the Mobile Doll system that allows EL-Divers to manifest into the real world. In GBN, his avatar, named Ansh, is a purple Haro with a menacing look, similar to Nena Trinity's Haro from Mobile Suit Gundam 00. When May wanted to make her own Gunpla he taught her how to do it and personally supervised her while she was making her custom Wodom. He still has a superiority complex and only logs in to GBN during emergencies and with Admin/Developer leashed.
During the final battle against Alus, both him and Koichi piloted the MHF-01DR Lord Astray Double Rebake, a customized Lord Astray Z from Mobile Suit Gundam SEED ASTRAY Princess of the Sky which allowed both divers to pilot one mobile suit and is armed with two forms, each tailored to both divers' fighting styles. Tsukasa control the Gunpla's Reverso Mode.

 / 

The reigning champion of GBN and leader of the Force group , where Hiroto was formerly affiliated with before he left the group 2 years ago. It was he who invited Hiroto into Avalon when he met Hiroto by mere chance a few years before he met Riku. For the past two years he kept Hiroto's loss, burden, all data on him and Eve secret. Unwilling to delete their photos and logs, he attempted to bury them.  Along with Karuna and Emilia, he was glad to see him again, and return to the fold. He was also happy to see Hiroto being social once more and that he was more stable than he was when he last saw him. In the final episode when he was talking to the game master and Ms. Tori in a real world meeting, more details are revealed from when he was a beta tester while GBN was still being developed.
He appears in the BUILD DiVERS' special battle piloting the AGE-TRYMAG Gundam TRY AGE Magnum, which its design is inspired and based on the AGE series units from Mobile Suit Gundam AGE and utilizes the TRY-AGE system on its weaponry including the ability to use cards based on the Gundam AGE mobile suits for enhancements. During the Gunpla Battle Royal, he pilots an unmodified ZGMF-X20A Strike Freedom Gundam from Mobile Suit Gundam SEED Destiny equipped with the METEOR support system.

One of the two Sub-Leaders of Avalon, who is a close friend and former senior of Hiroto while he was affiliated with the group 2 years ago, implying that Hiroto was in Avalon for years, along with the time Hiroto spent with Eve. He personally likes acting superior to Hiroto whenever he is trying to help Hiroto train. During the EL-Diver incident, Hiroto knew he would have accepted and understood his situation with losing Eve, however he knows he is terrible at keeping secrets. During the celebratory party at the Build Divers' Nest for the birth of Re:Rising Gundam and Hiroto's first special move, he reminds Hiroto that he is still part of Avalon, even if he is not in the actual force, and to come visit them.
He pilots the AGMF-X56S/l Impulse Gundam Lancier, a customised ZGMF-X56S Impulse Gundam, from the last few episodes of the previous series. Since He and Emilia could always beat Hiroto two on one, and they were both a strong duo at backing up and supporting the champion, this concept inspired their Impulses' gimmicks.

 / 

The protagonist of the previous series and the founder, leader, and ace of the original "Build Divers" on which the name of Hiroto's group have originated from. During Hiroto's time in Avalon, he attempted to shoot him down after a heated battle between him and Kyoya while he allied with Ogre, for personal reasons. He was shocked and apologetic over Hiroto's loss before the battle with the Second Coalition of Volunteers, May having told him, Sarah, and his team about it. Only Sarah went with him when he went to reconcile and resolve things with Hiroto, considering he needed to offer to return her to him. However, Hiroto, remembering he already has May and having no real grudge against him, ended up thanking him and Sarah instead, knowing she has been in good hands all along and assured that Eve's loss was her own choice. The two befriended each other, promising to keep having gunpla battles again, with an eventual rematch. He also takes part in defending GBN against Alus, dealing the killing shot alongside Hiroto. He makes no appearance in Battlelog however it's implied that both teams ended up merging into one force and he gave Hiroto Force leadership.
In the special battle against BUILD DiVERS and the final battle with Alus and his fleet he used the GN-0000DVR/SM Gundam 00 Sky Moebius as his main Gunpla which is an upgraded Gundam 00 Sky with newer parts and weapons.

A member of the original "Build Divers", one of the 87 EL-Divers and the first of them to be discovered in GBN. Due to that, for the past two years she has been the most well known EL-Diver. Unknowingly to her she was in fact the little sister of the first EL-Diver.  May met her during the day she first entered the real world. She was shocked and saddened upon learning the truth about her older sister, Eve, and the true reason behind the outcome of that battle from May and realized Hiroto was the heartbroken Avalon member she saw with Karuna after Riku called out to her while she was in the Coalition's custody, hence the reason he fled. Regardless of Hiroto's two years of resentment towards the Build Divers and himself and never acknowledged her as a real Build Diver member, he left them alone for her sake and to honor Eve. Due to Hiroto's nightmare in his back story and why she kept her Pet, Mol, close, the latter knew of Eve, but didn't know who she was to her. Nevertheless, she was very touched by Hiroto's kindness for thanking Riku for saving her, finishing Eve's will, holding no grudge against the Build Divers, and knowing she had an older sister who went so far for her, even had the man she loved be the one to do it. Later on it is revealed that she along with Eve merited the faces of two of Alus's creators. Currently, Hiroto continues to view her as Eve's younger sister and May's sister.
When in GBN, she uses the HER-SELF Mobile Doll Sarah even for support during the battle against Alus's fleet.

Leader of Force group  and still Riku's main rival, he appeared in the series as one of the many divers who volunteered to train the BUILD DiVERS on their last mission in Eldora. He also gave some advice to Parviz regarding the strategy on Alus's units and their weaknesses. 
In the series, he uses the RX-78GP02R天 Gundam GP-Rase-Two-Ten as his main Gunpla, created after upgrading the Gundam GP-Rase-Two out of his own frustration on not being able to play GBN due to the server's downtime.

Ogre's younger brother and a member of Hyakki, he also appeared as part of the Coalition of Volunteers. 
During the BUILD DiVERS' special match, he uses the GNX-803DG Do-ji GN-X as his main Gunpla, a combination of the GNX-803OG Ogre GN-X and the xvt-mmc Geara Ghirarga. In the final battle against Alus, he switched it out in favor of his old Gunpla, the xvt-mmc Geara Ghirarga.

 / 

Leader of Force group , whose avatar in the GBN world has the form of an ermine. In the series, he also has an alternate account going by the name of Captain Zeon, who is a famous G-Tuber and a veteran diver, who hosts his own show of him keeping GBN safe. Shown to be dressed in a red superhero outfit, he has a huge sense of justice and enthusiasm, which inspires Kazami to be his fan. In the guise of Captain Zeon he builds a bond with Kazami similar to Riku and Kyoya.
When Rommel is in his Captain Zeon persona, he uses the RX-93N04 ν-Zeon Gundam as his main Gunpla, created as a fusion of both Earth Federation and Zeon designs and focuses on both Close to Mid-Range combat. As himself, he pilots the GH-001RB Grimore Red Beret. During the Gunpla Battle Royal, he pilots an unmodified GF13-017NJII God Gundam from Mobile Fighter G Gundam as Captain Zeon.

A character of the spin-off manga Gundam Build Divers BREAK and a former Mass Diver. Being a rowdy person, he has an aggressive personality and speaks with a Kansai dialect. Before his force was formed, he was once a Mass Diver who used Break Decals provided by Tsukasa and enjoyed its corrupted powers despite the fact that it was breaking GBN. In that fact and with some inspiration from another friend he fought alongside the First Coalition of Volunteers for redemption. After the Break Decal incident, he completely changed his ways, formed the force group "ZA-∀Z" with his friend Zen and became part of the Third Coalition of Volunteers. In the final episode, he and Zen are present in the battle against Alus's invasion fleet.
Ark's main Gunpla is the GF13-017NJ/B Gundam Shining Break, a customized GF13-017NJ Shining Gundam from Mobile Fighter G Gundam which is given a flight form called "Shining Berkut" unlike its base model. Due to their fighting styles, both Ark and Zen can also execute a combination move named "Hard Improvisation".

A character of the spin-off manga Gundam Build Divers BREAK and also a former Mass Diver. Zen was a close friend of Ark, who like him, also has been using Break Decals for fun and enjoyment despite its corrupting nature. However after the Break Decal incident, he changed his ways, formed the force group "ZA-∀Z" with his friend and became part of the Coalition of Volunteers. In the final episode, he and Ark are present in the battle against Alus's invasion fleet.
Zen's main Gunpla is the YG-III Gundam G-Else, a customized YG-111 Gundam G-Self from Gundam Reconguista in G equipped with the Grow Up Units in both of its arms and legs for offensive and defensive situations. With his and Ark's fighting styles, they can both execute a combination move named "Hard Improvisation".

A character of the spin-off manga Gundam Build Diver Rize. He is one of the known 87 EL-Divers and the most recent one to appear, making him the 87th. He first appears as a mid teen boy in front of the diver user Tetsu (who eventually becomes his caretaker and father figure) and due to his sudden appearance, he was given that name after the first word that appeared in his head, "Rise". After that, he is given a Gunpla as a body with the help from both Koichi Nanase and Tsukasa Shiba; however, the body he inhabits in the real world is not a Mobile Doll, but a Gunpla based on Hiroto's Core Gundam that the latter saw it in the game, got impressed and told Tetsu how to build it, where it was modified with Mobile Doll Tech right after. His goal in the game is to surpass GBN's current champion, Kyoya Kujo. During the final battle against Alus, Rize assists the Third Coalition of Volunteers while protecting the Gaza Brothers after one of its members are down.
Rize's main Gunpla is the PFF-X7R Core Gundam [Rize], a replica of Hiroto's original Core Gundam built by Tetsu, following Rize's instructions, as the main body of Rize to inhabit in the real world. Also due to how the Core Gundam Rize is built it has the core-change gimmick. It can be equipped with the Anima Armor in battle similar to the Planets System theme, turning it into the PFF-X7R/ANIMA Gundam Anima [Rize] and with the Aun[Rize] Armor that also turns it into the Gundam Aun [Rize].

 / 

The head of the administrators of GBN who oversees its functions and security. His avatar is based on a SD Gundam Force character Gundiver. In the final battle against Alus, both him and Miss Tori use a customized GunPanzer. In real life, he is clad in a green shirt worn on top of a collared one.

The developer and creator of GBN. Her avatar is based on the Crystal Phoenix from SD Sengokuden Densetsu no Daishogun. It is revealed that she was in the same location as Hiroto when the broadcast of Sarah's capture was made and where Eve was sacrificed to buy Sarah more time to be saved. In real life, she is a classy lady wearing a black hat with a fake phoenix feather and sunglasses.

Other Characters

A mysterious blonde girl who befriended Hiroto a few years prior to events of Gundam Build Divers; this friendship between the two soon escalated into romance. Since her disappearance, Hiroto has been searching for her throughout the game. It is later revealed that she is the first to exist of the 87 EL-Divers and Sarah's older sister, although through the few years she spent together with Hiroto and those close to him she kept her EL-Diver identity a secret, and she was seemingly affiliated with Avalon. She had many personality traits and abilities that Sarah has and more, most notably having empathic senses for people and gunpla. Her existence also caused glitch bugs in the game, but small ones that were not that harmful. However, a few years later, she could no longer contain Sarah's bugs due to the backlash from the Break-Decal incident. Before the events of the battle between the original Build Divers and the second Coalition of Volunteers, she pleaded with Hiroto to mercifully sacrifice her using the Core Gundam and promise to her that he will still be the same caring person to help others in need, especially her sister, also mentioning that she would only pass on into GBN's Sea of Data. Despite his plead to stop her, she ended up a sacrifice right before Hiroto's eyes and her form faded out of existence. This incident traumatized Hiroto greatly, which led him to blame Riku and the Build Divers before ultimately sparing him in order to save Sarah's life and leaving Avalon to become a rouge diver, but kept a vow to never blame Sarah. In the final episode, May, another EL-Diver whom Hiroto teamed up with, is revealed to be born with some lingering remnants of her lost data, sporting her earring on her armband, which she wore under her jacket the whole time. Hiroto finally has closure but continues to view her has all the Build Divers' true Goddess of Victory, with Hinata as her priestess.

Hiroto's father, who is a freelance writer and novelist. During the series, he suffers from writer's block and constantly forces himself to come up with stories by locking himself in his room. In the final episode, he manages to come up with at least one story regarding the phenomenal link between GBN and Eldora.

Hiroto's mother who works as a translator. She has a completely different work ethic from her husband, but they both still get along well.

Manager of The Gundam Base Yokohama who is regarded as a Gunpla Meister. Ken is a fan of Henken Bekkener from Mobile Suit Zeta Gundam, to the point of sporting the character's mustache. During the final battle against Alus, he pilots a Gunperry carrying multiple armors for the Core Gundam II and tanks a shot from Alus who had stolen Hiroto's Earthree armor and weapons for Hiroto. 

Masaki's elder sister, who takes care of him in the hospital.

Production
The series was first teased back in the Gundam 40th Anniversary Beyond Press conference back on November 11, 2018. On July 5, 2019, Sunrise teased the new series in a preview during the 40th anniversary promotional video. and revealed the official title during the 2019 Japan Expo in Paris. Both Twitter and official websites also confirm the new series. In the official press conference held on July 31, 2019, Sunrise revealed more on the series's characters and mobile suits alongside the series's staff. It is the first Gundam series produced by Sunrise Beyond, an animation studio established after Xebec's closure in March 2019.

The series's Original Net Animation format and its planned release for online viewing and steaming came from Sunrise Beyond's producer, Takuya Okamoto. He did stated that "The TV brand is still large, so there was some concern that the broadcast scale would decline, but there is a strong point in the Internet distribution that not only Japan but the entire world can be watched simultaneously." Despite the series's shift into online streaming, the show will still air on television through BS11.

Media

Anime
The first season aired on Sunrise's Gundam Channel YouTube channel from October 10 to December 26, 2019, with Sunrise announcing a simulcast streaming on other platforms following with a TV airing on BS11 on October 12, 2019. A second season premiered on April 9, 2020. On April 27, 2020, it was announced that episodes from 19 onward would be delayed indefinitely due to the ongoing COVID-19 pandemic. On June 25, 2020, it was announced that it would resume on July 9, 2020. Spira Spica performed the series' first opening theme song "Re:RISE", while PENGUIN RESEARCH performs the second opening theme song "Hatena". SudannaYuzuYully performed the series' first ending theme song "Magic Time" while Spira Spica performed the second and third ending songs "Twinkle" and "Heartful" (the last song is used in the ending of episode 20). The series's music is composed by Hidemura Kimura.

Original net animation
An original net animation (ONA) titled  premiered on Sunrise's own Gundam Channel YouTube on November 13, 2020. Similar to the previous Battlogue series, the ONA features Gunpla battles based on fan votes including characters from both Build Divers and Build Divers Re:Rise. The ONA was directed by Masami Obari, and the rest of the staff from Gundam Build Divers Re:Rise returned to reprise their roles.

Manga
A spinoff manga titled  began serialization in Kadokawa Shoten's monthly Gundam Ace Magazine in December 2019 and ended in March 2021. It was compiled into three volumes. Ryōji Sekinishi and Shiitake Gensui returned to write and illustrate the spinoff manga series with Takayuki Yanase providing the mecha designs.

Merchandise
Part of the series's merchandise was released under Bandai's long running Gunpla line of scale models and sub-collectible line such as Robot Spirits figures.

References

External links
 
 (BS11) 

Gundam anime and manga
2019 anime ONAs
Anime postponed due to the COVID-19 pandemic
Anime productions suspended due to the COVID-19 pandemic
Artificial intelligence in fiction
Mecha anime and manga
Metafictional television series
Shōnen manga
Sunrise (company)
Virtual reality in fiction